Botanichesky Sad is a station on the Moscow Central Circle of the Moscow Metro. Construction started on the station in October 2014 and the station opened in September 2016.

Name
The station is named for the nearby Moscow Botanical Garden.

Transfer
The station offers free out-of-station transfers to Botanichesky Sad station of the Kaluzhsko-Rizhskaya Line. In 2018, the city plans to complete an underground facility that connects the stations.

Gallery

References

External links 
 
 Ботанический сад mkzd.ru 

Moscow Metro stations
Railway stations in Russia opened in 2016
Moscow Central Circle stations